Ultraviolence or Ultra-violence may refer to:

 A term used in the Anthony Burgess novel A Clockwork Orange and the Stanley Kubrick film of the same name

Music
 Ultraviolence (band) an industrial/techno band headed by Johnny Violent, AKA Jonathan Casey

Albums
 Ultraviolence (album), a 2014 album by Lana Del Rey
 The Ultra-Violence, the 1987 debut album by thrash metal band Death Angel

Songs
 "Ultraviolence" (song), a 2014 single by Lana Del Rey 
 "Ultra-Violence", a song by Lower Class Brats from their 1998 album Rather Be Hated Than Ignored
 "Ultraviolence", a song by New Order from their 1983 album Power, Corruption & Lies
 "Ultraviolence/Screaming", a medley of songs by Scream from their 1983 album Still Screaming
 "Ultraviolence", a song by Heartsrevolution released in 2008
 "The Ultraviolence", a song by Joe Stump from his 1993 album Guitar Dominance!
 "Ultra-Violence", a song by Mickey Avalon from his upcoming 2020 album Speak of the Devil

Entertainment
 Ultraviolence, a hardcore wrestling style in Combat Zone Wrestling
 Ultra-violence, is the second hardest difficulty mode in the 1993 video game Doom, and the third hardest difficulty mode in the 2016 video game Doom